Francesco Viganò (born 1 March 1966) is an Italian judge and criminal law professor at the Bocconi University in Milan. He was appointed Judge of the Constitutional Court of Italy by president Sergio Mattarella, and sworn in on 8 March 2018.

Biography
Viganò graduated in 1989 at the University of Milan, and after having stayed at the University of Munich from 1991 to 1993, in 1998 he obtained a research PhD from the University of Pavia.

A researcher since 1995 at the University of Brescia, in 2001 he became an associate professor at the same university teaching Comparative Penal Law. From 2004 to 2016 he taught Advanced Criminal Law and European Criminal Law at the University of Milan. From November 2016 he has taught Criminal Law and Transnational Criminal Law at the Bocconi University.

On 24 February 2018 he was appointed Judge of the Constitutional Court of Italy by president Sergio Mattarella as replacement of Paolo Grossi.

References

1966 births
Living people
Academic staff of Bocconi University
Judges of the Constitutional Court of Italy
Labour law scholars
University of Milan alumni
Academic staff of the University of Milan
University of Pavia alumni